The 1989 IBF World Championships were held in Jakarta, Indonesia, in 1989. Following is the results of the women's doubles.

Main stage

Section 1

Section 2

Section 3

Section 4

Final stage

External links 
 Results

1989 IBF World Championships
IBF